The National  Mass Media Commission is a Government of Ghana agency mandated with the responsibility of registering, regulating and monitoring the activities of media houses in Ghana.The current chairman of the commission is ace and veteran journalist, Mr Kwesi Gyan-Appenteng.

Overview
The National Media Commission was set on July 7, 2000 by an Act of Parliament:
 Act 1993, Act 449 in pursuit of the provisions of Chapter 12 of Ghana's 1992 Constitution is enjoined among others to take all measures to ensure the establishment and maintenance of the highest journalistic standards on mass media, including investigation, mediation and settlement of complaints made against or by the press or other mass media.

See also
Ghana Library Association
Ghana Bar Association
Constitution of Ghana

References

Ministries and Agencies of State of Ghana
1993 establishments in Ghana
1993 in law